Janio Carlo Pósito Olazabal (born 10 October 1989) is a Peruvian footballer who plays as a forward. He currently plays for Asociación Deportiva Tarma

Club career
Janio Posito began his career with Sporting Cristal, joining their first team in 2007. Months later he made his league debut in the Torneo Descentralizado in Round 21 (Apertura), coming on in the 86th minute in a 0–0 draw at home against Coronel Bolognesi. In his second match he recorded his first win with Cristal in Round 7 (Clausura) this time playing away to Bolognesi, which finished a 0–1 for his side. In his fourth match, he played his first derby match in the 2–1 loss (Clausura) away to Universitario de Deportes, as he came on as a late substitute for Gianfranco Espejo. He finished his debut season with five appearances in the 2007 season.

The following season, he featured only two times for Cristal and played for the first time in the starting eleven in the 2–0 home win over Sport Boys, which was his last game for the Rimenses.

In January 2009 he joined Coronel Bolognesi but did not make an appearance for them. Later that same year he joined Carlos A. Mannucci and played in the Copa Perú division.

Then in January 2011 Posito joined José Gálvez FBC.

References

External links

1989 births
Living people
Peruvian footballers
Sporting Cristal footballers
Carlos A. Mannucci players
Coronel Bolognesi footballers
José Gálvez FBC footballers
Los Caimanes footballers
Comerciantes Unidos footballers
Sport Rosario footballers
Club Alianza Lima footballers
FBC Melgar footballers
Universidad Técnica de Cajamarca footballers
Cusco FC footballers
Peruvian Primera División players
Peruvian Segunda División players
Association football forwards